The Sahlgrenska University Hospital (Swedish: Sahlgrenska Universitetssjukhuset) is a hospital network associated with the Sahlgrenska Academy at the University of Gothenburg in Gothenburg, Sweden. With 17,000 employees the hospital is the largest hospital in Sweden by a considerable margin, and the second largest hospital in Europe. It has 2,000 beds distributed across three campuses in Sahlgrenska, Östra, and Mölndal. It provides emergency and basic care for the 700,000 inhabitants of the Göteborg region and offers highly specialised care for the 1.7 million inhabitants of West Sweden. It is named after philanthropist Niclas Sahlgren.

History 
Sahlgrenska University Hospital was formed in 1997 by the merger of three hospitals: Sahlgrenska Hospital, Östra Hospital, and Mölndal Hospital. The Sahlgrenska University Hospital has been operated by the Västra Götaland Regional Council since its formation in 1999.

The Sahlgrenska Academy 

Sahlgrenska Academy is the University of Gothenburg's faculty of education and research in health sciences.  It operates in close conjunction with the university hospital.  The academy was formed the 1st of July 2001 by combining the three previous faculties for medicine, odontology and health sciences. Within the academy is the Sahlgrenska Cancer Center, focusing on translational oncology research. The center is a joint effort between the Sahlgrenska Academy at University of Gothenburg and the Sahlgrenska University Hospital. The long-term goal of the center is to improve the care of cancer patients by facilitating new scientific discoveries and translating these into clinical practice.

Educational programs are available in biomedical, dietitian sciences, physician, nursing, medical specialist, dentist, and medical physicist. With Sahlgrenska academy's focus, University of Gothenburg is ranked worldwide 33 and 40 for Clinical medicine and Biomedical sciences respectively in the subject ranking by  Academic Ranking of World Universities AWRU Shanghai (2018).

The Sahlgrenska University Hospital in the Webometrics Hospital specific ranking 2017, was 1st in Sweden, 10th in Europe and 41st worldwide.

Hospitals

Sahlgrenska Hospital 
Sahlgrenska Hospital is the oldest and largest hospital in the network. It was founded in 1782 in Sillgatan (now Postgatan) in Gothenburg with a donation by Niclas Sahlgren. In 1823, it was moved to Oterdahl House, today a museum of medical history. In 1855, it was moved again to a building (now named Sociala Huset) in Carolus Dux at Västra Hamngatan, and named Allmänna and Sahlgrenska Hospital. Since 1900, it was moved to its present premises in Änggården, and in 1936 it was named the Sahlgrenska Hospital.

On 24 June 2009, a  new facility with 312 beds was officially opened. The new facility will enable rebuilding and renovation of older facilities at Sahlgrenska.  The facility also features nephrology centre, dialysis, transplantation centre, stroke unit, hematology, and wards for medicine and surgery.

Östra Hospital 

Östra Hospital was built during the 1960s.

Mölndal Hospital 
Mölndal Hospital was completed on 14 May 1924, to replace an old hospital in Mölndals Kvarnby.

Högsbo Hospital

Queen Silvia's Children's Hospital

Notable people
 Mats Brännström; Professor of obstetrics and gynaecology; leader of the team behind the first successful uterus transplantation.
 Nils Kock; former chief of surgical staff; developer of the Kock pouch surgical procedure.
 Katharina Sunnerhagen, Professor of rehabilitation medicine; created guidelines for stroke rehabilitation

In popular culture
Lisbeth Salander, a central character in the Millennium series by Stieg Larsson, is treated at Sahlgrenska Hospital after being shot.

References

External links

  
  

1772 establishments in Sweden
Hospitals established in the 1770s
Hospitals in Gothenburg
Organizations based in Gothenburg
Teaching hospitals in Sweden
University of Gothenburg